Aberfan Cemetery is a cemetery near the village of Aberfan, Merthyr Tydfil. It is one of five cemeteries in Merthyr Tydfil County Borough, and is particularly well known for the graves of 144 victims of the Aberfan disaster in 1966, when a colliery coal tip collapsed and killed many people in the village of Aberfan.

The cemetery was opened in 1876, and includes Bryntaf Cemetery, an extension opened in 1913. It covers about 8 acres (3 hectares). The cemetery is Green Flag Accredited. In 2022 the cemetery, together with the memorial garden and the area of the tip and its slide path, were listed on the Cadw/ICOMOS Register of Parks and Gardens of Special Historic Interest in Wales. The record of the Grade II* listed site describes it as being "of great national importance and meaning."

As well as a monument to the Aberfan disaster victims, there is also a military monument to seven soldiers drowned in the Bristol Channel in 1888.

References

External links
 

Cemeteries in Wales
Registered historic parks and gardens in Merthyr Tydfil County Borough